Hibiscus hirtus or Lesser Mallow is a species of Hibiscus found in India. It is an perennial deciduous shrub with a maximum height about 1 meter.

References

External links
 
 

hirtus